Belinda Aquino, Ph.D., is an academic, author, and civil and women's rights activist best known for having founded the Center for Philippine Studies at the University of Hawaiʻi at Mānoa, and for being one the United States' most prominent experts in the field of Philippine politics, power, and culture.

Although not related to prominent Marcos critic Benigno Aquino Jr., Aquino's stance on women's empowerment began as a community development worker in the 1970s, which included promoting the use of birth control and encouraging women to find employment instead of being housewives. Her being outspoken on the human rights abuses of the Marcos dictatorship led to her being put on the Marcos administration's watchlist while she was earning her Ph.D. in Political Science at Cornell University. It became too dangerous for her to go home to the Philippines, and so she eventually began teaching at the University of Hawaiʻi at Mānoa.

Her books on the ill-gotten wealth of Ferdinand Marcos, including "Politics of plunder: the Philippines under Marcos" (1987) and "The Transnational Dynamics of the Marcos Plunder" (1999) became important texts on the unexplained wealth of the Marcos family.

See also 
 Jovito Salonga
Martial law under Ferdinand Marcos

References 

University of the Philippines Diliman alumni
Year of birth missing (living people)
Living people